Chyże  is a village in the administrative district of Gmina Bełżec, within Tomaszów Lubelski County, Lublin Voivodeship, in eastern Poland. The village is located in the historical region Galicia.

The village has a population of 380.

References

Villages in Tomaszów Lubelski County